The Universal Basketball Association (UBA) is a semi-professional men's basketball minor league in the United States that began play in 2009. The league typically play a Spring season schedule.

Teams are split into geographical divisions, from Georgia, Indiana, Kentucky, North Carolina, Ohio and Texas.

History 
UBA announced the addition of an Eastern division scheduled to begin in 2015. Teams are based in North Carolina.

Teams

Champions

References

External links 
 Official UBA website

Basketball leagues in the United States
Professional sports leagues in the United States